Adina Merenlender (born October 1, 1963) is a Professor of Cooperative Extension in Conservation Science at University of California, Berkeley in the Environmental Science, Policy, and Management Department, and is an internationally recognized conservation biologist known for land-use planning, watershed science, landscape connectivity, and naturalist and stewardship training.

Early life and education 
Merenlender was born in Seattle, Washington and raised in West Los Angeles, California.

Merenlender graduated from UC California San Diego in 1985 with a BA in Biology, where she also received her MS from the Department of Ecology and Evolutionary Biology in 1986. She was a visiting graduate student at Princeton University from 1987 to 1993, and she graduated from the University of Rochester in 1993 with a PhD in Biology.

Career 
After earning her PhD in Biology, Merenlender did her post-doctoral fellowship at the Center for Conservation Biology at Stanford University from 1993-1995, researching riparian plant and aquatic insect communities on Great Basin working lands under different livestock grazing regimes. She started her career at UC Berkeley as assistant cooperative extension specialist and adjunct professor in 1995, at which time she moved to Mendocino County to conduct research at the UC Hopland Research and Extension Center, a 5,000-acre field station.

Upon arriving in California's wine country, Merenlender conducted some of the first research in Vinecology, the integration of ecological and viticultural practice to produce win-win solutions for wine production and nature conservation. The goal is a diverse landscape that yields sustainable economic benefits, species and habitat protection. Merenlender continues to advance conservation in working landscapes to maintain biodiversity, provide goods and services for humanity, and support the abiotic conditions necessary for sustainability and resilience. Her work across California's North Coast vineyard landscape also includes watershed studies, revealing ways to avoid summer water withdrawals from streams to irrigate wine grapes, which is a necessary step to recovering California's salmon runs.

Merenlender led the earliest inquiries into the realized conservation benefits, or lack thereof, from conservation easements which spurred a large and still-growing body of scholarship on the topic. She also provided some of the first evidence for the impacts of quiet recreation on meso-carnivores and sparked continued field research into recreation management to minimize these impacts.

Merenlender started the California Naturalist Program and served as its founding director, which to date has graduated over 4,000 certified California Naturalists. Building on the success of this program, Merenlender helped start the first public education and service program on climate stewardship, including writing Climate Stewardship: Taking Collective Action to Protect California with Brendan Buhler. The two programs provide collective impact on ecological health through community and citizen science.

In 2004, Merenlender was a visiting scholar at the University of Queensland Department of Zoology in Brisbane, Australia. She was also a visiting scholar at the National Autonomous University of Mexico (UNAM) in Mexico City in 2008, and with the Cambridge Conservation Initiative through the University of Cambridge Zoology Department in 2019.

As president, Merenlender worked with the Governing Board and staff to reorganize the Society of Conservation Biology as a global network to preserve biodiversity.

Awards and honors 

 President, Society for Conservation Biology, 2019-2021
 California Academy of Sciences Fellow, 2018
 Distinguished service award for outstanding extension work at UC Agriculture and Natural Resources (UCANR), 2016
 Program of the Year, California Naturalist Program, by Alliance for Natural Resource Outreach and Service Programs, 2015
 Handling Editor, journal, Conservation Biology
 Section Editor, journal, PlosOne

Published works 
Merenlender has published over 100 scientific research articles focused on the underlying relationships between land use and biodiversity, and co-authored the only comprehensive book on wildlife corridor planning, titled Corridor Ecology: The science and practice of linking landscapes for biodiversity conservation, with the first edition published in 2006 and the second in 2019. She also co-authored The California Naturalist Handbook, published in 2013, as well as the forthcoming book, Climate Stewardship: Taking Collective Action to Protect California, due to be published in September 2021.

Selected publications

References

External links 
 

1963 births
Living people
Princeton University alumni
University of California alumni
University of Rochester alumni
University of California, Berkeley faculty
21st-century American biologists
American conservationists
American women environmentalists
Academic journal editors
21st-century American women